The queen of hearts is a playing card in the standard 52-card deck.

Queen of Hearts or The Queen of Hearts may refer to:

Books
 "The Queen of Hearts" (poem), anonymous nursery rhyme published 1782
 The Queen of Hearts, an 1859 novel by Wilkie Collins
 The Queen of Hearts (1881), a picture book by Randolph Caldecott
 Queen of Hearts (Alice's Adventures in Wonderland), a character from Alice's Adventures in Wonderland
 Queen of Hearts (Disney), Disney's adaptation of the character

Film and television
 Queen of Hearts (1936 film), a British musical starring Gracie Fields
 Queen of Hearts (1989 film), a comedy by Jon Amiel
 Queen of Hearts (2004 film), an Australian drama film written and directed by Danielle MacLean
 The Queen of Hearts (2009 film), a French film
 Queen of Hearts (2019 film), a Danish film
 Queen of Hearts (TV play), a 1985 BBC TV play
 Queen of Hearts (D:TNG episode), an episode of Degrassi: The Next Generation
 "Queen of Hearts" (Merlin), a 2010 episode of Merlin
 "Queen of Hearts" (Once Upon a Time), a 2012 episode of Once Upon a Time
 Cora/Queen of Hearts, a character from the episode

Music
 Queen of Hearts (musician), English electronic music artist

Albums
The Queen of Hearts (album), by Offa Rex (Olivia Chaney and the Decemberists), 2017
Queen of Hearts, a 2011 album by Jai Uttal

Songs
 "Queen of Hearts" (Joan Baez song), a 1965 traditional song
 "Queen of Hearts" (Hank DeVito song), a 1979 song written by Hank DeVito and performed by Dave Edmunds and later by Juice Newton
 "The Queen of Hearts" (song), a 1998 song by Agnetha Fältskog
 "Queen of Hearts", a 1973 song by Gregg Allman from Laid Back
 "Queen of Hearts", a 1990 song by Bad Boys Blue from Game of Love
 "Queen of Hearts", a 1978 song by David Coverdale from Northwinds
 "Queen of Hearts", a 2010 song by Jason Derülo from Jason Derulo
 "Queen of Hearts," a 2011 song by Fucked Up from David Comes to Life
 "Queen of Hearts", a 2013 song by We the Kings from Somewhere Somehow

Podcasts 

 Queen of Hearts, a 2022 dating game show podcast hosted by Jujubee

See also

 or 

Queen of Clubs (disambiguation)
Queen of Diamonds (disambiguation)
Queen of Spades (disambiguation)
Knave of Hearts (disambiguation)
 Jack of Hearts (disambiguation)
 King of Hearts (disambiguation)
 Ace of Hearts (disambiguation)
Barzan Abd al-Ghafur Sulayman Majid al-Tikrit, a Republican Guard commander under Saddam Hussein, the queen of hearts in the US deck of most-wanted Iraqi playing cards
Diana, Princess of Wales (1961–1997), nicknamed Queen of people's Hearts
The Looking Glass Wars, a series of novels by Frank Beddor featuring Queen Redd, an amalgamation of the Queen of Hearts and the Red Queen
"Queen of the Broken Hearts", a 1983 song by Loverboy
Red Queen (Through the Looking-Glass), a character in Lewis Carroll's Through the Looking-Glass
 Ispade Rajavum Idhaya Raniyum (English : King of Spades & Queen of Hearts), a 2019 Indian Tamil language romantic thriller film